Marcelle Demougeot (18 June 1876 – 24 November 1931), born Jeanne Marguerite Marcelle Decorne, was a French soprano, "the best-known French Wagnerian singer of her generation".

Early life 
Jeanne Marguerite Marcelle Decorne was born in Dijon, where she studied with Charles Laurent. She trained further as a singer at the Conservatoire de Paris.

Career 
Demougeot made her professional debut in 1902, as Donna Elvira in Paris. She was known for singing Wagnerian roles including Brünnhilde and Kundry. She sang in several premiere productions, including Le fils de l’étoile (1904) by Camille Erlanger, Ariane (1906) by Massenet, a French-language production of Das Rheingold (1909) by Wagner, Déjanire, (1911) by Camille Saint-Saëns, and the Paris premiere of Parsifal (1914). She made several recordings before 1910.  

In 1916, Demougeot sang at a benefit for blind veterans in Vichy. She sang La Marseillaise outside the Palais Garnier to mark the signing of peace at the end of World War I, and later sang at a victory festival in Ostend. In 1919 she sang at the official Bastille Day celebrations in Paris. In 1924 she sang during festivities surrounding the Summer Olympics in Paris.

Personal life 
Demougeot died in 1931, in Paris.

References

External links 
 Arakelyan, Ashot. "Marcelle Demougeot (Soprano) (Dijon 1876 - Paris 1931)" Forgotten Opera Singers (June 6, 2014). A blogpost with images and links.
 A 1904 recording of Demougeot and tenor Agustarello Affre singing a duet from Les Huguenots, on YouTube.
 A 1905 recording of Demougeot singing "Sombre forêt", from YouTube.

20th-century French women opera singers
French operatic sopranos
1876 births
1931 deaths
Musicians from Dijon